Stenaelurillus specularis is  a species of jumping spider in the genus Stenaelurillus that the endemic to Malawi. It was first described in 2014 by Wanda Wesołowska. The carapace has two white streaks and the female abdomen has a triangular-shaped white marking. It is distinguished from other members of the genus by the male's shiny black area on the abdomen, after which the species is named. and the female's short, wide epigyne that has two large oval copulatory openings.

Taxonomy
Stenaelurillus specularis was first described by Wanda Wesołowska in 2014. It is one of over 500 species identified by the Polish arachnologist. It was placed in the genus Stenaelurillus, first raised by Eugène Simon in 1885. The name relates to the genus name Aelurillus, which itself derives from the Greek word for cat, with the addition of a Greek stem meaning narrow. In 2017, it was grouped with nine other genera of jumping spiders under the name Aelurillines. It has been placed in the subtribe Aelurillina in the tribe Aelurillini in the clade Saltafresia. The species name is a Latin word that can be translated brilliant and recalls the shining area on the male's abdomen.

Description
The spider is small. The brown carapace is hairy and slightly pear-shaped. It has two white streaks that cross the main part of the body and wide white bands around the margins. This shiny patch is the most distinguishing feature of the spider. The eye field is black and is surrounded by long brown bristles. The spinnerets are black, and the legs are yellow. The pedipalps are light and hairy and similar to Stenaelurillus darwini but differs in the shape of palpal bulb, having a shorter lobe shape at the rear. The embolus is short. The spider can be distinguished from the similar Stenaelurillus tettu by the narrow and bent projection from the palpal bulb.

The female is similar to the male in size and shape. The carapace is also pear-shaped and coloured similarly, but the abdomen is has a large triangular area of white similar to other species in the genus. The spinnerets are light and legs yellow-orange. The epigyne is short, wide and has two large oval copulatory openings. Due to the lack of the abdomen's shiny patch, it is the design of the epigyne that most distinguishes the female of the species from other members of the genus.

Distribution
The species was first identified in the Viphya Mountains of Malawi based on examples found in 1978. It is endemic to the country.

References

Citations

Bibliography

Arthropods of Malawi
Salticidae
Spiders described in 2014
Spiders of Africa
Taxa named by Wanda Wesołowska